Kochkurovo is the name of several rural localities in Russia:
Kochkurovo, Dubyonsky District, Republic of Mordovia, a selo in the Republic of Mordovia
Kochkurovo, Kochkurovsky District, Republic of Mordovia, a selo in the Republic of Mordovia
Kochkurovo, Nizhny Novgorod Oblast, a selo in Nizhny Novgorod Oblast